World's Biggest Pac-Man is a browser game created by Australian website designer Soap Creative along with Microsoft and Namco Bandai Games. It is a Pac-Man game which differed from the original by having multiple players play together in a series of user-created, customizable and interlocking mazes. The game was announced at the Microsoft MIX Developer Conference on 13 April 2011.

The game was built as a HTML5 project for Microsoft's (then) new Internet Explorer 9, as well as to commemorate the 30th anniversary of Pac-Man. A week after launching, it had 13,500 user-designed mazes and nearly 300 million dots eaten. Created as a community tribute to the original Pac-Man arcade game, it followed the guidelines that Namco Bandai originally set for Pac-Man. The project was designed to be community-driven and a team of moderators were implemented to keep an eye out for any offensive mazes that might be created.

Although no login is required to play the game, users who wish to create their own mazes or post high-scores have to sign in using Facebook Connect. Although created with Internet Explorer 9 in mind, World's Biggest Pac-Man is playable on any browser supporting HTML5.

Around 18 June 2022 the site went down, showing just a blank page and later a database error. The site was back up by 5 July.

Gameplay
The gameplay for World’s Biggest Pac-Man is similar to classic Pac-Man, but with a few differences. As before, the goal is to eat all of the dots and power pellets in the maze without being caught by the ghosts roaming through it. The number of power pellets is not fixed at four, but instead determined by the user who created that particular maze. In addition, there are no tunnels; instead, doorways at each edge of the screen allow Pac-Man to travel to an adjacent maze, with a new arrangement of dots and obstacles. Every maze has a fresh set of four ghosts, but they do not use the doorways. The player has the ability move to a new maze without clearing the current one so they can return to any unfinished maze at a later time. The game continues until the player ran out of lives.

Another distinct feature in World's Biggest is the ability to construct new mazes adjacent to pre-existing ones. To build a maze a Facebook account is required, and is accessed via the Facebook Connect platform. The game also has two high score leaderboards, one where players could competing against each other for the top of the leaderboard, and the other where countries were ranked based on their players' total high score. The player also has the option to display high scores online via Facebook.

Ghosts
One aim of the game, besides eating all the Pac-Dots, is avoiding any of the four ghosts roaming through the maze. Running into a ghost will kill Pac-Man on contact, unless Pac-Man consumed a Power Pellet. These pellets, which can be freely placed when creating a maze (a minimum of 0 and a maximum of 10 per maze), will turn the tables completely for a period of time by causing the ghosts to turn blue and run away from Pac-Man, allowing him to eat them. In the original game, the ghost AI was programmed in a well-defined pattern of Scatter, Chase and Repeat. Unlike the original, the time the ghosts remained vulnerable does not diminish as the game progresses to the point where the ghosts could merely reverse direction. If the player left a maze without completing it, the ghosts will stay where they left off in that maze until Pac-Man returned to that maze, after which they will begin chasing him again.

Fruits
The fruits on World's Biggest Pac-Man are a potent means to earn additional points. The fruits appear upon consuming a certain number of pellets on the current maze and the player can retrieve them as long as they show up, but otherwise do not affect the completion of the level. By default, the fruit will be a 100-point cherry, and for every maze cleaned of pellets, the next maze attempted will advance to the next fruit and remain until the player finishes another board and the fruit value further increases. Once the player has cleared seven boards, the bonus "fruit" will be indefinitely locked at the 5,000-point key until the game ended.

Cherry, 100 (or 200) points
Strawberry, 300 (or 400) points
Peach, 500 (or 600) points
Apple, 700 (or 800) points
Melon, 1000 (or 1500) points
Galaxian, 2000 (or 2500) points
Bell, 3000 (or 4000) points
Key, 5000 points

Maze Creation

World's Biggest Pac-Man has a unique feature that distinguishes it from the original game, in which users are able to create their own mazes. This feature requires Facebook Connect. To create a maze, users can highlight a square in the maze grid. When creating a maze, users are able to add walls, power pellets, delete any excesses or mistakes, or simply reset the maze to start over. Once the maze is completed, users can submit it to add it to the grid alongside other user-created mazes. At the moment, the game has a grid of over 4,000 x 4,000, supporting over 16 million mazes. Dan Kitzler, of West Covina, California, USA, was the first to reach the edge of the "supposed" 4,000 X 4,000 grid on 21 November 2016. He went beyond that grid number, shattering the illusion that the grid only contains 16 million mazes. Dan contacted Ashley Ringrose (website creator), who admitted he had no idea about the actual size of the maze grid. The maze grid was made up of 25 X 25 (625 maze) quadrants.

Reception
The Guardian has called the game "an internet hit", while ABC News has called it a "web sensation".

High Scores
There was a Guinness World Record for "The highest score on World's Biggest Pac-Man". At the time, it was 5,555,552 points which was set by Stephen Kish on 14 August 2011. They no longer hold such a category on their website. That high score was beaten unofficially by a Twitch streamer known as NewTxtDoc. He reached a score of 11,111,108 over a 25-hour period from the 23 November to 24 November 2020.

References

External links
Official site
Microsoft Australia’s news article about launching World’s Biggest Pac-Man
 Current statistics of World's Biggest Pac-Man (not accurate)

Browser games
Pac-Man
2011 video games
Microsoft games
Namco games
Video games developed in Australia